The Pakistan National Congress (PNC), later known as the Bangladesh National Congress,  was a political party that mainly represented the Hindus and other religious minorities in Pakistan. The party championed secularism in the Muslim-dominated state, and its electoral and organisational strength was mainly based in East Bengal (also known as East Pakistan, now the independent state of Bangladesh).

Background
The Pakistan National Congress traces its roots to the Indian National Congress, which was the largest national political party in India. The Indian National Congress, led by Mahatma Gandhi, Vallabhbhai Patel and Jawaharlal Nehru championed secularism, composite nationalism, religious tolerance and opposed the Pakistan movement led by the Muslim League. However, ensuing communal conflict led to the partition of India and the creation of Pakistan from Muslim-majority provinces. The religious violence and mass migration as a result of partition significantly reduced the Hindu, Sikh and non-Muslim population of Pakistan. The leaders and activists of the Indian National Congress who continued to live in Pakistan joined with the representatives of Hindu, Sikh, Buddhist and Christian communities to form a new political party, the Pakistan National Congress. Although most of them had opposed the partition of India, the members of the new party accepted the state of Pakistan and did not maintain any organisational links with the Indian National Congress.

Positions
The Pakistan National Congress stood for secularism, equality of all religions and citizens and protection of religious and ethnic minorities. The party sought peaceful and friendly relations between Pakistan and India. The party was one of many that opposed the suppression of democracy and civil rights by successive military regimes. The Pakistan National Congress also stood against the growth of Islamic fundamentalism in Pakistani society, politics and government. The party also supported the Bengali language movement in East Bengal.

Bengali Language Movement

National Congress was the only party at the opposition side of the house during the movement. In both Legislative Assembly and in Constituent Assembly they exposed of the logical position of the language demand. In doing so some of the members were called Indian agents and were harassed by the government. Some leaders were also arrested and one of them was killed inside the jail.

Electoral performance
While partition riots and mass migration had significantly reduced the Hindu and Sikh population in West Pakistan, Hindus still constituted twenty percent of the population of East Bengal (also East Pakistan). Consequently, the PNC's base and organisation were concentrated in that province of Pakistan. In the 1954 elections held for the East Bengal Legislative Assembly, the Pakistan National Congress won 28 seats.

Bangladesh
After the Bangladeshi War of Independence, the party briefly survived as the Bangladesh National Congress ( Bangladesh Jatiya Congress). The party stood one candidate, Sree Peter Paul Gomez in the 1973 election for Dacca-25, but did not win the seat.  The party was dissolved in 1975 after the formation of the Bangladesh Krishak Sramik Awami League as the sole political party of Bangladesh.  It is unknown how long the party survived in West Pakistan.

(Incomplete) List of Congress members in the 1st Constituent Assembly

East Bengal
Prem Hari Barma
Raj Kumar Chakraverty
Sris Chandra Chattopadhyaya
Akhay Kumar Das
Dhirendra Nath Datta
Bhupendra Kumar Datta
Jnanendra Chandra Majumdar
Birat Chandra Mandal
Sri Dhananjoy M.A. B.L. Roy
Maudi Bhakesh Chanda
Harendra Kumar Sur
Kawivi Kerwar Datta

West Punjab
Ganga Saran, Rai Bahadur Lala

See also 
 Indian Union Muslim League

References

Socialist parties in Pakistan
Hinduism in Pakistan
Defunct political parties in Pakistan
Nationalist parties in Pakistan
Secularism in Pakistan